County Hall is a municipal facility in Carricklawn, Wexford, County Wexford, Ireland.

History
Wexford County Council had previously been based in an aging facility in Hill Street. The new building, which was designed by Robin Lee Architecture, cost over €50 million to build. It was officially opened by Brendan Howlin, Minister for Public Expenditure and Reform, in 2011. It received a Civic Trust Award in 2012.

References

Buildings and structures in County Wexford
Wexford